Kadarius "K. D." Johnson (born May 25, 2001) is an American college basketball player for the Auburn Tigers of the Southeastern Conference (SEC). He previously played for the Georgia Bulldogs.

High school career
Johnson played basketball for Southwest DeKalb High School in Decatur, Georgia. As a junior, he averaged 21.9 points, 5.9 rebounds, 5.3 assists and 4.5 steals per game, receiving Georgia Class 5A Player of the Year honors. Johnson played a postgraduate season at Hargrave Military Academy in Chatham, Virginia. He averaged 26.2 points, 7.4 assists, 4.7 rebounds and 3.1 steals per game per game, leading his team to a 37–4 record and the Final Four of the National Prep Tournament. A four-star recruit, he committed to playing college basketball for Georgia in October 2019, despite never having an official visit, over offers from Texas A&M, Tennessee and Ole Miss, among others.

College career
Johnson missed the first 10 games of his freshman season for academic reasons before being cleared to play on January 11, 2021. Two days later, he made his debut, recording 21 points, seven rebounds and four steals in a 95–77 loss to Auburn. On February 13, Johnson posted a season-high 24 points and four steals in a 115–82 loss to Alabama. As a freshman, he averaged 13.5 points, 2.8 rebounds and 1.8 steals per game in 16 games, earning Southeastern Conference (SEC) All-Freshman Team honors. For his sophomore season, Johnson transferred to Auburn.

Career statistics

College

|-
|2020–21
|Georgia
| 16 || 0 || 22.5 || .422 || .387 || .615 || 2.8 || 1.2 || 1.8 || .2 || 13.5
|-
| 2021–22
| Auburn
| 34 || 31 || 27.8 || .386|| .290 || .721 || 2.9 || 1.6 || 1.9 || .1 || 12.3
|- class="sortbottom"
| style="text-align:center;" colspan="2"| Career
| 50 || 31 || 26.1 || .397 || .318 || .681 || 2.8 || 1.4 || 1.9 || .1 || 12.7

References

External links
Auburn Tigers bio
Georgia Bulldogs bio

2001 births
Living people
American men's basketball players
Auburn Tigers men's basketball players
Basketball players from Atlanta
Georgia Bulldogs basketball players
Hargrave Military Academy alumni
Point guards